"Half Light" is a song by the British drum and bass producer Wilkinson. It features vocals from British singer Tom Cane. It was released on 1 June 2014 through RAM Records as the sixth single from his debut studio album Lazers Not Included. The song has charted at number 25 on the UK Singles Chart, making "Half Light" Wilkinson's second top 40 single after "Afterglow".

Music video
The music video to accompany the release of "Half Light" was first released onto YouTube on 1 May 2014. It was directed by Aoife McArdle.

Track listing

Credits and personnel
 Vocals, writer – Thomas Havelock
 Producer, programming – Mark Wilkinson
 Additional producer, synth keys – Bradford Ellis
 Label – RAM Records, Virgin EMI Records

Chart performance

Weekly charts

Release history

References

2013 songs
2014 singles
Wilkinson (musician) songs
RAM Records singles
Songs written by Tom Cane